This is a list of Swedish television related events from 1993.

Events
14 January - British children's animated series Postman Pat begins its very first airing in Sweden on TV4.

Debuts

Domestic
16 November - Morsarvet (1993) (STV)
1 December - Tomtemaskinen (1993) (SVT1)

International
14 January -  Postman Pat (1981, 1991–1992, 1995, 1997, 2004-2008) (TV4) 
3 September -  Darkwing Duck (1991-1992) (STV)
 The Bluffers (1986) (TV4)

Television shows

Ending this year

Births

Deaths

See also
1993 in Sweden

References